Point Culver is a headland on the south coast of Western Australia. It is located at 32° 54' S 124° 41' E, near the western end of the Great Australian Bight. The point marks the western end of the Baxter Cliffs, which extend eastwards for nearly 200 km along the coast.

It was discovered on 18 January 1801 by Matthew Flinders:

The white cliffs reminded Flinders of the cliffs of Culver Down on the Isle of Wight.

The area was explored by land in the 1860s.

It defines part of the coast where there are three possible locations of access by boat, Toolinna Cove and Twilight Cove being the other two locations.

Notes

References
Point Culver in the Gazetteer of Australia online

Culver
South coast of Western Australia
Nuytsland Nature Reserve